Seven ages or 7 Ages may refer to:

 Seven ages of man, in William Shakespeare's  As You Like It 
 Seven Ages, a TV Irish history documentary series
 Seven Ages of Rock, a TV music documentary series
 The Seven Ages, an orchestral suite by John Alden Carpenter
 The Seven Ages (film), a short film directed by Edwin S. Porter 
 The Seven Ages of Man (painting series),  a series of paintings by Robert Smirke
 7 Ages, a board game by the Australian Design Group

See also
 Seven Ages of the World or Six Ages of the World, a Christian historical periodization
 Ages of Man, the stages of human existence on the Earth according to Greek mythology